This is a summary of 1927 in music in the United Kingdom.

Events
January
Peter Warlock's string serenade is recorded for the National Gramophonic Society, by John Barbirolli and an improvised chamber orchestra; it is the first recording of the composer's work ever to be released.
Edward Clark transfers from BBC Newcastle to London as a programme planner, at the request of Percy Pitt.
20 January – On his way to the HMV studios at Hayes, Middlesex, bandleader Jack Hylton is involved in a serious road accident.
date unknown
Following the death of impresario Robert Newman in the previous year, publishers Chappell & Co. withdraw their financial support for The Proms, to be replaced by the BBC.
Rebecca Clarke forms the English Ensemble piano quartet with Marjorie Hayward, Kathleen Long and May Mukle. 
Gustav Holst is commissioned by the New York Symphony Orchestra to write a symphony, but does not do so.  Instead, he starts work on the tone poem Egdon Heath, which is premiered by the NYSO in the following year.
The first recordings of Frederick Delius's music are conducted by Thomas Beecham for the Columbia label: the "Walk to the Paradise Garden" interlude from A Village Romeo and Juliet, and On Hearing the First Cuckoo in Spring, performed by the orchestra of the Royal Philharmonic Society.

Popular music
Herbert Farjeon – "I've danced with a man, who's danced with a girl, who's danced with the Prince of Wales".
Will Fyffe – "I Belong to Glasgow"

Classical music: new works
Arnold Bax – Northern Ballad No. 1
Arthur Bliss – Oboe Quintet
Havergal Brian – Symphony No. 1 Gothic
Frank Bridge – Rhapsody: Enter Spring
Edward Elgar – Civic Fanfare
Gerald Finzi – Violin Concerto
Victor Hely-Hutchinson – Carol Symphony
John Ireland – Sonatina
Albert Ketèlbey - By the Blue Hawaiian Waters
Constant Lambert – The Rio Grande

Opera
Geoffrey Toye - The Red Pen, with libretto by A. P. Herbert.

Musical theatre
1 December - The review Clowns in Clover  opens at the Adelphi Theatre ; it runs for 508 performances.

Births
26 January - Ronnie Scott, jazz musician and club owner (died 1996)
7 February – Laurie Johnson, composer
10 February – Brian Priestman, conductor and music teacher (died 2014)
20 March – John Joubert, South African–born British composer (d. 2019)
12 June – Al Fairweather, jazz musician (died 1993)
14 June – Elaine Hugh-Jones, pianist and composer
23 June – Kenneth McKellar, tenor (died 2010)
4 July – Patricia Kern, mezzo-soprano (died 2015) 
19 July – John Hopkins, orchestral conductor who worked in the UK, New Zealand and Australia (died 2013)
11 August – Raymond Leppard, conductor
25 September – Sir Colin Davis, orchestral conductor (died 2013)
28 October – Cleo Laine, singer
9 November – Ken Dodd, comedian and singer (died 2018) 
7 December – Helen Watts, contralto (died 2009)
26 December – Denis Quilley, actor and singer (died 2003)

Deaths
26 February – Isabel Jay, singer and actress with the d'Oyly Carte Opera Company, 47
17 March – James Scott Skinner, violinist, 83
31 March – Edward Lloyd, concert and oratorio tenor, 82 
16 May – Sam Bernard, entertainer, 63
2 November – Fred Billington, singer and actor with the d'Oyly Carte, 63
21 December – Courtice Pounds, singer and actor with the d'Oyly Carte, 65
date unknown – Haldane Burgess, writer and musician, 65

See also
 1927 in British television
 1927 in the United Kingdom
 List of British films of 1927

References

British Music, 1927 in
Music
British music by year
1920s in British music